Airline was a British fly on the wall television programme produced by LWT that showcases the daily happenings of passengers, ground workers and flight crew of Britannia Airways (series 1) and later EasyJet (from series 2).

The show was broadcast between March 1998 and January 2007 on ITV, was often repeated on ITV2 and aired in syndication on Pick (previously known as Sky Three and Pick TV), Sky Real Lives and, as of 4 February 2019, CBS Reality. The programme's success sparked a US version of the series, following American low-cost airline Southwest Airlines.

Production
EasyJet were first approached about the possibility of filming during mid-1998, after the first series with Britannia Airways (filmed at Manchester Airport in 1997) was discontinued. The first series with EasyJet was broadcast in January 1999, and the programme continued with them until it was discontinued. In 2003 it was ITV's most popular factual programme. The programme has been sold to many countries worldwide, including New Zealand, Australia, and Japan.

Starting with the second series in 1999, the programme follows passengers and staff of EasyJet and Reed Aviation (the handling agents) including Manager: Graham Fraser; Check-in trouble-shooter: Jane Boulton; Check-in assistant: Katrina Leeder; Supervisors: Leo Jones, Brett Holland and Leanne Cheung, Dispatcher: Kevin Reardon; Captain: James McBride, Stewardess: Janey Stock and Stelios as well as many passengers. The series were originally set in Liverpool and Luton but later incorporated Belfast, Bristol and Newcastle airports. Airline was also occasionally filmed at Gatwick and Stansted airports. Tony Robinson and Veronika Hyks replaced Charlie Higson as voiceover.

The programme also follows some passengers and staff on interesting journeys and during important moments in their lives. Wedding proposals, marriages, illnesses, business trips, reunions and once-in-a-lifetime experiences have all been filmed, both happy and sad, and one 2001 episode featured exclusively on the consequences the September 11 attacks had on EasyJet's operations at Luton. The programme also aims to educate the airline's passengers concerning its rules and regulations—some of the highlighted issues relate to missed check-in, incorrect travel documentation, and the carriage of prohibited items.

Regular contributors

Notable Britannia staff
Supervisors: Pat Baines, Cathy Duffy
Captains: Peter Klack, Tony Rex
Flight Steward/Stewardesses: Brian John Aldridge (BJ)

Notable EasyJet/Aviance staff

Staff overview

Series list of EasyJet staff

Format

Opening titles
These titles have a sky background and feature a Britannia plane (series 1) or an EasyJet plane (series 2–4) before cutting to clips of the overall series. For series 5 and 6, these titles changed to using a lighter blue sky and switching to an all blue logo. For the next two series, the titles changed to using an orange sky and blue/orange logo. For the final two series, they were similar style to that used in series 5 and 6 but now with a reddish tint and features an airline in the logo.

Opening and ending sequences
At the start of each series the narrator would show snippets of what was to come throughout the series. This would normally be announced with the phrase "Welcome onboard another series of Airline"
At the beginning of each episode in every series, the narrator would give a quick preview of what would be shown.This would normally be announced with the phrases "Coming up/Tonight on Airline" or "Onboard Airline tonight".
At the end of most episodes, the narrator would provide an epilogue of what eventually happened to some of the passengers, staff, or business decisions (e.g. new plane, stock price) involved in that particular episode.
Series 1-4 did not show what was coming up in the next episode but did feature at the end of the programme, before the credits, information of what happened to the passengers featured.
Starting in series 5, clips of what would feature in the next episode were shown during the first 10 seconds of the credits.
At the end of each series, the narrator would look back and highlight some of the more important things shown such as gripping stories about various members of airline staff. This would take about a minute and feature the common phrase "The Summer/Winter season has come to an end".

Changes to Luton Airport throughout filming
 – Area not used for Passenger operation at the time

Series guide

Special episode

Holiday Airline
Series 1: 10x30' (2001) – First shown from 31 August 2001.

See also
 Airport (1996–2005, 2008)
 Animal Airport (2000)
 (London) Luton Airport (2005–08)
 Air Ways (Australia, 2009–2012)
 Come Fly with Me (2010–2011)
 Heathrow: Britain's Busiest Airport (2015–present)
 EasyJet: Inside the Cockpit (2017, 2019)

References

External links

1998 British television series debuts
1990s British reality television series
2000s British reality television series
2007 British television series endings
Documentary television series about aviation
English-language television shows
ITV reality television shows
London Weekend Television shows
Luton Airport
Television series by ITV Studios
Aviation television series